The Garrett VanMeter House (ca. 1830) is an historic home near Old Fields, Hardy County, West Virginia, USA.

The house is a two-story brick I house dwelling with a two-story rear "ell".  It has Greek Revival stylistic elements. Attached to the ell is a one-story summer kitchen. It has a side gable roof and sits on a stone foundation.  It features a centered entrance portico.

The house was built about 1830 to 1835 by Garrett VanMeter (1804-1856) who had inherited the land from his father, Colonel Jacob Vanmeter.  Colonel Jacob Vanmeter was the son of Colonel Garrett Vanmeter.  The Vanmeters were the first white settler (1744) in the area. The Colonel (he had commanded a regiment in the Revolutionary War) was one of the wealthiest farmers in the region. He owned several hundred head of cattle and about 30 slaves. (No land records, or other corroborating documents, are available to confirm the dates of construction, which are estimates.)

The Garrett VanMeter House is one of four significant VanMeter family dwellings; the others are Traveler's Rest, Fort Pleasant, and Buena Vista Farms.

It was listed on the National Register of Historic Places in 2001.

References

Dutch-American culture in West Virginia
Greek Revival houses in West Virginia
Houses completed in 1830
Houses in Hardy County, West Virginia
Houses on the National Register of Historic Places in West Virginia
I-houses in West Virginia
National Register of Historic Places in Hardy County, West Virginia
1830 establishments in Virginia